Sport Vereniging Cosmos, known as SV Cosmos, is a Surinamese football club. They play their home games in Paramaribo at the Frank Essed Stadium.

They were relegated from the Hoofdklasse in 2006–07 and again relegated, from the Eerste Klasse, the following season. The club were formerly known as S.V. Road, before changing their name to Cosmos.

References

Cosmos
Cosmos